The 2022 municipal elections in Ontario were held on October 24, 2022.

Voters in the province of Ontario elected mayors, councillors, school board trustees and all other elected officials in all of the province's municipalities.

In total, 32 of Ontario's 444 municipalities will not hold elections, as their entire councils were elected by acclamation. In total, 139 municipalities had their mayors or reeves acclaimed. Elections were not held in Armour, Armstrong, Brethour, Chamberlain, Chapleau, Charlton and Dack, Dawn-Euphemia, Dorion, Drummond/North Elmsley, East Garafraxa, Enniskillen, Evanturel, Front of Yonge, Gordon/Barrie Island, Hilton, Hilton Beach, Hornepayne, Howick, Kerns, Lake of the Woods, Laurentian Hills, Minto, Oil Springs, Perry, Sioux Narrows-Nestor Falls, South River, Tay, The Archipelago, Thessalon or Thornloe.

Electoral System
In 2016, the Legislative Assembly of Ontario passed Bill 181, the Municipal Elections Modernization Act, which permitted municipalities to adopt ranked ballots for municipal elections.

London was the only municipality to use ranked ballots in the 2018 election itself, with the decision in that city being made by London City Council in 2017, while Cambridge and Kingston held referendums concurrently with their 2018 elections on whether to adopt ranked ballots for the next municipal elections in 2022, with both referendums passing.

However, in 2020 the Legislative Assembly of Ontario passed the Supporting Ontario's Recovery and Municipal Elections Act, 2020, which removed the option for ranked choice voting in municipal elections. Therefore, London will switch back to First-past-the-post voting for the 2022 election, the cities of Cambridge and Kingston will not be able to switch to ranked ballots.

By municipality

Counties
 2022 Bruce County municipal elections
 2022 Dufferin County municipal elections
 2022 Elgin County municipal elections
 2022 Essex County municipal elections
 2022 Frontenac County municipal elections
 2022 Grey County municipal elections 
 2022 Haliburton County municipal elections 
 2022 Hastings County municipal elections
 2022 Huron County municipal elections
 2022 Lambton County municipal elections
 2022 Lanark County municipal elections
 2022 Leeds and Grenville United Counties municipal elections
 2022 Lennox and Addington County municipal elections 
 2022 Middlesex County municipal elections
 2022 Northumberland County municipal elections
 2022 Perth County municipal elections
 2022 Peterborough County municipal elections
 2022 Prescott and Russell United Counties municipal elections
 2022 Renfrew County municipal elections 
 2022 Simcoe County municipal elections
 2022 Stormont, Dundas and Glengarry United Counties municipal elections
 2022 Wellington County municipal elections

Districts
 2022 Algoma District municipal elections
 2022 Cochrane District municipal elections 
 2022 Kenora District municipal elections
 2022 Manitoulin District municipal elections
 2022 Nipissing District municipal elections
 2022 Parry Sound District municipal elections
 2022 Rainy River District municipal elections
 2022 Sudbury District municipal elections
 2022 Thunder Bay District municipal elections
 2022 Timiskaming District municipal elections

Regional municipalities
 2022 Durham Region municipal elections
 2022 Halton Region municipal elections
 2022 Muskoka District municipal elections 
 2022 Niagara Region municipal elections
 2022 Oxford County municipal elections
 2022 Peel Region municipal elections
 2022 Waterloo Region municipal elections
 2022 York Region municipal elections

Single-tier municipalities
Municipalities with more than 125,000 people: 
 2022 Barrie municipal election
 2022 Greater Sudbury municipal election
 2022 Guelph municipal election
 2022 Hamilton, Ontario municipal election
 2022 Kingston, Ontario municipal election
 2022 London, Ontario municipal election
 2022 Ottawa municipal election
 2022 Toronto municipal election
 2022 Windsor municipal election

Single-tier municipalities
Municipalities with fewer than 125,000 people:

Belleville

The results for mayor of Belleville are as follows:

Mayor

Belleville City Council
The candidates for Belleville City Council are as follows.

Brant, County of

Mayor
The results for mayor of the County of Brant are as follows:

Brant County Council
The results for Brant County Council were as follows. Two to be elected from each ward.

Brantford

Mayor

Incumbent mayor Kevin Davis was challenged by former city councillor Dave Wrobel. 

The results for mayor of Brantford were as follows:

Brantford City Council

The results for Brantford City Council were as follows. Two elected from each ward.

Brockville

Mayor
The candidates for mayor of Brockville are as follows:

Chatham-Kent

Mayor

Incumbent mayor Darrin Canniff was challenged by truck driver Andy Fisher and retiree Bill Pickard.

Chatham-Kent Municipal Council

The results for Chatham-Kent Municipal Council were as follows.

Cornwall

Mayor
The results for mayor of Cornwall were as follows:

Cornwall City Council
The results for Cornwall City Council were as follows:

Gananoque

Mayor
Incumbent mayor Ted Lojko was challenged by military veteran John Beddows and perioperative nurse Greg Truesdell. 

The results for mayor of Gananoque were as follows:

Haldimand County
The results for mayor of Haldimand County and Haldimand County Municipal Council are as follows:

Mayor
Incumbent mayor Ken Hewitt ran for re-election. He ran in the 2022 Ontario general election for the Progressive Conservative Party of Ontario in Haldimand—Norfolk, losing to Independent Bobbi Ann Brady.

Haldimand County Municipal Council

Kawartha Lakes
The results for mayor of Kawartha Lakes and Kawartha Lakes City Council  were as follows:

Mayor 
Incumbent mayor Andy Letham did not run for re-election. Running to replace him includes city councillors Pat Dunn, Doug Elmslie and Kathleen Seymour-Fagan.

Kawartha Lakes City Council

Norfolk County
The candidates for mayor of Norfolk County and for Norfolk County Council were as follows:

Mayor
Incumbent mayor Kristal Chopp ran for re-election. Running against her were county councillors Amy Martin and Ian Rabbitts, former Simcoe town councillor Bill Culver and businessman David Bate.

Norfolk County Council

Orillia

Mayor
Incumbent mayor Steve Clarke did not run for re-election of Orillia. The candidates for mayor of Orillia are as follows:

Pelee

Mayor
The results for Pelee Island were as follows:

Pembroke

Mayor
The candidates for mayor of Pembroke are as follows:

Council
Top candidate becomes Deputy Mayor.

Peterborough
The results for mayor of Peterborough and Peterborough City Council  are as follows:

Mayor
Incumbent mayor Diane Therrien did not for re-election. Candidates running to replace her include former Liberal MPP Jeff Leal and city councillors Henry Clarke and Stephen Wright.

Peterborough City Council
The results for Peterborough City Council are as follows. Two councillors are elected from each of the 5 wards.

Prescott
Town councillor Gauri Shankar has been acclaimed as mayor of Prescott.

Prince Edward County

Mayor
The results for mayor of Prince Edward County are as follows:

Quinte West

Mayor
The results for mayor of Quinte West and Quinte West City Council were as follows:

Quinte West City Council

Smiths Falls

Mayor
Incumbent mayor of Smiths Falls Shawn Pankow was challenged by the "self-proclaimed resident protestor" Justin Duhamel.

St. Marys
Incumbent mayor Al Strathdee was re-elected by acclamation for a third term.

Stratford

Mayor
Incumbent mayor Dan Mathieson did not run for re-election. The results for mayor of Stratford were as follows:

St. Thomas

Mayor
The results for mayor of St. Thomas and St. Thomas City Council were as follows:

St. Thomas City Council

References

External links
Association of Municipalities Ontario - Results 

2022 Ontario municipal elections